International Thomson Organization (ITO) was a holding company for interests in publishing, travel, and natural resources, that existed from 1978 to 1989. It was formed as a reorganisation of the Thomson Organization, which had been founded by Roy Thomson, 1st Baron Thomson of Fleet (Lord Thomson of Fleet; 1894–1976) in 1959. It merged with Thomson Newspapers to become the Thomson Corporation in 1989.

ITO was formed in order to move the Thomson Organization's operating base from Britain to Canada, so that it would not be subject to British monopolies legislation, foreign-exchange controls and dividend limitation. Under Roy Thomson's son Kenneth Thomson, ITO sold its natural resources and continued expanding in publishing and media. In 1980, Thomson acquired Jane's, an publishing company specializing in military intelligence. In 1981, it acquired the publishing operations of Litton Industries, including the Physicians' Desk Reference. By 1986, International Thomson had acquired business publisher Warren, Gorham & Lamont; legal publishers Callaghan & Company and Clark Boardman; and automotive publishers Ward's. Other publishers acquired include Gale, Mitchell, and Thomson & Thomson. In 1988, ITO acquired the British company Associated Book Publishers, which included Sweet & Maxwell, Chapman & Hall, The Law Book Company of Australasia, and Routledge. In 1989, ITO acquired Lawyers Cooperative Publishing, including subsidiaries Bancroft-Whitney and Research Institute of America.

References

Thomson Reuters
Defunct companies of Ontario
Holding companies established in 1978
Publishing companies disestablished in 1989
Publishing companies established in 1978
1989 disestablishments in Ontario
Canadian companies established in 1978
Canadian companies disestablished in 1989
1978 establishments in Ontario
1989 mergers and acquisitions